The Chinese Ambassador to the United Kingdom is the official representative from the People's Republic of China to the United Kingdom of Great Britain and Northern Ireland.

Formerly the Chinese ambassadors represented the Qing Empire (1875–1912) and the Republic of China (1912–1950).

List of ambassadors

 1875–1878: Guo Songtao
 1878–1885: Zeng Jize
 1885–1889: 
 1889–1893: Xue Fucheng
 1893–1896: Kung Chao-Yuan
 1896–1901: 
 1901–1905: 
 1905–1907: Wang Daxie
 1907–1910: Li Jingfang
 1910–1914: 
 1914–1920: Alfred Sao-ke Sze
 1920–1922: Wellington Koo
 1922–1925: 
 1925: Yan Huiqing
 1926–1929: Wang Jingwei
 1929–1932: Alfred Sao-ke Sze
 1932–1941: Guo Taiqi
 1941–1946: Wellington Koo
 1946–1950: Cheng Tien-hsi
 1954–1962: 
 1962–1967: Xiong Xianghui
 1967–1969: 
 1969–1970: Ma Jiajun
 1970–1972: Pei Jianzhang
 1972–1977: Song Zhiguang
 1978–1983: Ke Hua
 1983–1985: 
 1985–1987: 
 1987–1991: Ji Chaozhu
 1991–1995: 
 1995–1997: Jiang Enzhu
 1997–2002: 
 2002–2007: 
 2007–2010: Fu Ying
 2010–2021: Liu Xiaoming
 2021-: Zheng Zeguang

See also
 List of ambassadors of the United Kingdom to China
China–United Kingdom relations

References

 
United Kingdom
China